Michelle Thompson may refer to:
 Michelle Thompson (taekwondo), American taekwondo practitioner
 Michelle Thompson (politician), member of the Nova Scotia House of Assembly

See also
 Michelle Thomson, member of the Scottish Parliament